The Sam Hill Memorial Bridge, also known as the Biggs Rapids Bridge, is a steel truss bridge in the northwest United States that carries U.S. Route 97 (US 97) across the Columbia River between Biggs Junction in Sherman County, Oregon, and Maryhill in Klickitat County, Washington. It was named in honor of the early bridge proponent Sam Hill, the builder of the nearby Maryhill Museum of Art.

Construction on the Biggs Rapids Bridge began on October 3, 1960, and was funded by the Washington State Toll Bridge Authority. The bridge cost $2.4 million to construct and was dedicated in honor of Sam Hill during its opening ceremonies on November 1, 1962. It was initially a toll bridge charging $1 per vehicle, but the tolls were removed in February 1975.

The bridge was closed during part of 2007–2008 in order to complete repairs to the deck. Originally the Washington State Department of Transportation planned to replace the entire deck in 2010, but accelerated the project due to rapidly deteriorating roadway.  By March 2009 the project was finished at a total cost of project $16 million, split evenly between Oregon and Washington. It included replacing the deck with concrete, installing new railing, improving the drainage systems, and replacing the existing lighting.  The new deck is expected to last 25 years.

See also
 
 
 
 
 List of crossings of the Columbia River

References

U.S. Route 97
Bridges completed in 1962
Columbia River Gorge
Bridges over the Columbia River
Transportation buildings and structures in Klickitat County, Washington
Transportation buildings and structures in Sherman County, Oregon
Road bridges in Oregon
Road bridges in Washington (state)
Bridges of the United States Numbered Highway System
1962 establishments in Oregon
Former toll bridges in Oregon
Former toll bridges in Washington (state)
Steel bridges in the United States